Biography of Heartbreak is the second full-length album by American pop rock band This Century. It was released worldwide on May 14, 2013, via Rude Records in Europe, the UK, Southeast Asia, Australia and Japan, and independently in the US in partnership with their management team Eighty One Twenty Three.

Produced by Colby Wedgeworth (The Maine, Lydia), the album includes "Bleach Blonde" and "Skeletons" as well as 11 brand new tracks. On April 23, 2013, This Century released a music video for the first single "Slow Dance Night" on Vevo. In support of the album, This Century joined The 8123 Tour with management label-mates The Maine as well as A Rocket to the Moon and Brighten.

Track listing

Personnel
Members
 Joel Kanitz – Vocals
 Sean Silverman – Guitar
 Alex Silverman – Bass, keyboard
 Ryan Gose – Drums

Production
 Colby Wedgeworth – Producer, engineer, Mixer
 Dan Coutant – Master
 Alex Silverman – Additional Programming
 Joel Kanitz – Art Direction and Design
 Dirk Mai – Photography 
 Tim Kirch – Artist Management
 Tanner Radcliffe – Artist Management

References

External links

2013 albums